Mr. Music Head is the fourth solo album by Adrian Belew, released in April 1989, and his first for Atlantic Records. It features the single, "Oh Daddy".

Background

The album was recorded following the unwilling split of Belew's mid-1980s band the Bears, which dissolved due to a lack of record company support (following which Belew managed to secure a solo deal). Belew recorded the majority of the album by himself, making use of his own multi-instrumental abilities and his ability to create assorted sonic and instrumental impressions via processed guitar sound. The album also features a prominent use of piano, an instrument on which Belew was not particularly confident but which he applied to many songs which he believed required it.

The album features Belew's second duet with his daughter Audie, with whom he had previously recorded the piano-and-guitar duet "The Final Rhino" on his Lone Rhino album in late 1981 (when Audie was four). This time, Belew wrote a humorous father-and-daughter pop duet for himself and the now-eleven-year-old Audie to sing, poking gentle fun at Belew's own pop ambitions and career to date. The video for the single "Oh Daddy" featured Belew playing the rubber-necked guitar prop which he'd previously employed for the Home of the Brave project with Laurie Anderson.

Track listing
All songs written by Adrian Belew, except where noted.

 "Oh Daddy" – 3:05
 "House of Cards" – 3:44
 "One of Those Days" – 3:21
 "Coconuts" (Belew, Stan Hertzman) – 3:29
 "Bad Days" – 3:06
 "Peaceable Kingdom" – 3:36
 "Hot Zoo" – 4:24
 "Motor Bungalow" – 3:36
 "Bumpity Bump" – 3:46
 "Bird in a Box" – 3:16
 "1967" – 5:23
 "Cruelty to Animals" – 4:23

Notes
 The last track, "Cruelty to Animals", doesn't appear on vinyl and audio cassette versions.
 The song "Coconuts" was used as the title track for the movie Much Ice Crew's Coconuts (1989).

Personnel

Musicians
 Adrian Belew – vocals, guitars, piano, bass guitar, drums, percussion, additional instrumentation
 Mike Barnett – string bass  (tracks 2, 11)
 Audie Belew – vocal ("Oh Daddy")

Technical
 Adrian Belew – producer
 Rich Denhart – engineer
 Dan Harjung – assistant engineer
 Adrian (Sotto Vocé) – cover design
 Sandy Ostroff – photography
 Stan Hertzman – photography

References

Adrian Belew albums
1989 albums
Albums produced by Adrian Belew
Atlantic Records albums